The Freedom of the City is a play by the Irish playwright Brian Friel first produced in 1973. It is set in Derry, Northern Ireland in 1970, in the aftermath of a Civil Rights meeting, and follows three protesters who mistakenly find themselves in the mayor's parlour in the Guildhall. The plight of the protesters is that their mistaken circumstance is interpreted as an 'occupation'. The play illustrates their final hours in the Guildhall, their failed escape and the tribunal into their deaths.

Following a Northern Ireland Civil Rights Association march on 30 January 1972 in the events now known as Bloody Sunday, in which Friel participated, the British 1st Battalion Parachute Regiment opened fire on the protesters which resulted in thirteen murders. An early form of the play, having been started approximately ten months prior to Bloody Sunday, was modified following the events of the day to entail certain links to the events.

Performance and publication

The Freedom of the City was first performed at the Abbey Theatre, Dublin in Ireland, in 1973.

In Australia it remains a popular set text among English, English Literature, Drama and Theatre Studies secondary school students.

Plot
Set in Derry 1970, the play interweaves the 'present' - a hearing into the deaths of three unarmed citizens at the hands of the security forces, the reaction of the population shown by the character of the Balladeer and flashbacks to the main story - the final hours of the lives of three peaceful marchers who accidentally stumble into the Mayor's parlour after the march is hit by smoke and tear gas. Most of the action revolves around the unwinding personal stories of the three as they attempt to wait out the violence so they can go home only to find that they are now the centre of the action. Lily, a 43-year-old mother of eleven, Michael, a 22-year-old man (unemployed), and 'Skinner', 21 and unemployed (signs himself as Freeman of the City in the Visitor's Book), are the antiheroes, who perish as British soldiers shoot them in cold blood when they surrender.

The ultimate irony is that the judge finds the security forces didn't act punitively, that Lily and Michael were armed according to non-existent witnesses and that Skinner was the innocent instead of the angry young man who despite his background wanted a free Ireland.

First performance
The Freedom of the City was first performed in Dublin at the Abbey Theatre on 20 February 1973. The Cast was as follows:
 Ronnie Walsh as the Priest
 Niall O'Brien, Dermot Crowley and Colm Meaney as the three Soldiers
 John Kavanagh as the Judge
 Geoffery Golden as the Police Constable
 Pat Laffan as Dr. Dodds
 Raymond Hardie as Michael
 Angela Newman as Lily
 Eamon Morrissey as Skinner
 Michael O'hAonghusa as Balladeer
 Clive Geraghty as Brigadier Johnson-Hansbury
 Emmet Bargin as the Army Press Officer
 Edward Golden as Dr Winbourne (Forensic Expert)
 Derek Young as Professor Cuppley (Pathologist)
 Bob Carlile as the RTÉ Commentator
 Dinny O'Brien as the Accordionist

Context
 The events entail links to the events of Bloody Sunday, and The Troubles in Northern Ireland.
 Freedom of the City is an honour bestowed by many municipalities, including Irish ones, to esteemed members or organisations of the community for heroic community service (among other possible reasons); the term applies to two separate honours, one civilian and one military. Friel adopts a word play to presumably represent the  characters of the play and the protesters who took part in the Bloody Sunday march.
It is a semi-inherited honour which the descendants of former Freemen of the City can receive. During the 17th and 18th century in Derry the Freemen were part of the ruling body of the city council. Skinner signs himself in as 'Freeman of the City' and with a surname of Fitzgerald. In the report of the funeral procession his coffin is carried by the (Roman Catholic order) the Knights of Malta.

References

External links
 

1973 plays
The Troubles in Derry (city)
Plays by Brian Friel
Works about The Troubles (Northern Ireland)